Vidas Blekaitis (born 14 April 1972) is a Lithuanian strongman. As of 2007, Blekaitis was ranked World No. 4 by the International Federation of Strength Athletes. He placed 4th in the 2009 Arnold Strongman Classic. Blekaitis competed in the IFSA Strongman World Championships 3 times, finishing 7th in 2005, 4th in the 2006, and 6th in 2007.

Vidas Blekaitis placed second at the Giants Live Finland event on 13 August 2011. This placing qualified him for the 2011 World's Strongest Man contest, but he failed to make it to the finals.

Reality shows 
In 2009 Blekaitis was one of the contestants in Lithuanian television show „Šok su manimi“ ("Dance with me") and was eliminated without reaching the final

In 2014 Blekaitis was one of the contestants in Lithuanian version of reality show Celebrity Splash! called Šuolis!.

References

1972 births
Living people
Lithuanian male weightlifters
Lithuanian strength athletes
People from Birštonas
20th-century Lithuanian people
21st-century Lithuanian people